Bloomquist Creek is a stream in San Mateo County, California, and is a tributary of Pescadero Creek. It enters Pescadero Creek within the boundaries of Memorial Park.

Notes

See also
 List of watercourses in the San Francisco Bay Area

Rivers of San Mateo County, California
Rivers of Northern California